The teams competing in Group 9 of the 2015 UEFA European Under-21 Championships qualifying competition were Italy, Serbia, Belgium, Cyprus and Northern Ireland.

The ten group winners and the four best second-placed teams advanced to the play-offs.

Standings

Results and fixtures
All times are CEST (UTC+02:00) during summer and CET (UTC+01:00) during winter.

Goalscorers
 4 goals

  Michy Batshuayi
  Andrea Belotti
  Aleksandar Mitrović

 3 goals

  Paul-José M'Poku
  Luka Milunović
  Aleksandar Pešić

 2 goals

  Pieros Sotiriou
  Cristian Battocchio
  Daniele Rugani
  Slavoljub Srnić

 1 goal

  Jason Denayer
  Yannick Carrasco
  Thorgan Hazard
  Nathan Kabasele
  Maxime Lestienne
  Junior Malanda
  Pierre-Yves Ngawa
  Youri Tielemans
  Dimitris Froxylias
  Andreas Kyriakou
  Onisiforos Roushias
  Michael Thalassitis
  Zacharias Theodorou
  Domenico Berardi
  Federico Bernardeschi
  Jacopo Dezi
  Francesco Fedato
  Riccardo Improta
  Samuele Longo
  Antonio Rozzi
  Stefano Sturaro
  Marcello Trotta
  Federico Viviani
  Ryan Brobbel
  Johnny Gorman
  James Gray
  Darko Brašanac
  Goran Čaušić
  Uroš Đurđević
  Filip Kostić
  Uroš Vitas

 1 own goal

  Emilios Panayiotou (against Italy)
  David Morgan (against Serbia)

References

External links
Standings and fixtures at UEFA.com

Group 9